Berend "Bert" Romp (4 November 1958 – 4 October 2018) was a Dutch equestrian and Olympic champion in the sport. He won a gold medal in show jumping with the Dutch team at the 1992 Summer Olympics in Barcelona.

Romp died on 4 October 2018, a month before his 60th birthday, after a horse kicked him.

References

External links

1958 births
2018 deaths
Dutch show jumping riders
Olympic equestrians of the Netherlands
Dutch male equestrians
Olympic gold medalists for the Netherlands
Equestrians at the 1992 Summer Olympics
Equestrians at the 1996 Summer Olympics
People from Veendam
Olympic medalists in equestrian
Medalists at the 1992 Summer Olympics
Deaths by horse-riding accident in the Netherlands
Sportspeople from Groningen (province)
20th-century Dutch people